Benliahmet station is a freight station near the village of Benliahmet in the Kars Province of Turkey.

Railway stations in Kars Province
Railway stations opened in 1913
1913 establishments in the Russian Empire
Selim District